Anton Franz Nonfried, also known as Antonín František Nonfried, (16 October 1854, Rakovník – 16 December 1923, Rakovník) was a German Bohemian amateur entomologist and insect collector.

Published works

References

1854 births
1923 deaths
People from Rakovník
Czech entomologists